The Estonian Women's Supercup is Estonian football's annual match contested between the champions of the previous Naiste Meistriliiga season and the holders of the Estonian Women's Cup. If the Naiste Meistriliiga champions also won the Estonian Cup then the cup runners-up provide the opposition.

The current supercup holders are Flora Tallinn.

Matches

References

External links
 Official website

Women
Supercup
National women's association football supercups
2009 establishments in Estonia